Hittin' the Road is a live album by American southern rock band Outlaws, released in 1993. (See 1993 in music).

Track listing
"Hittin' the Road" (Thomasson) – 4:54
"There Goes Another Love Song" (Thomasson, Yoho) – 4:02
"Hurry Sundown" (Thomasson) – 4:19
"Waterhole" (Jones, Paul, Thomasson, Yoho) – 2:47
"Hitman Blues" (Traditional) – 8:43
"Evil, Wicked, Mean and Nasty" (Salem, Thomasson) – 8:06
"You Are the Show" (Thomasson) – 7:08
"Superficial Love" (Hicks) – 4:59
"(Ghost) Riders in the Sky" (Stan Jones) – 6:20
"Green Grass and High Tides" (Thomasson) – 12:21

Personnel
B.B. Borden - drums
Jeff Howell - bass guitar, vocals
Hughie Thomasson - guitar, vocals
Chris Hicks - guitar
Timothy Cabe - guitar

Production
Producer: Hughie Thomasson
Engineers: Steve Forney, Jeffrey Riedmiller, Steve Lowney, Bob Rivers
Mixing: Steve Forney, The Outlaws, Hughie Thomasson
Assistant engineers: David Kingsley, Howell Luther
Arranger: Hughie Thomasson

References

Outlaws (band) albums
1993 live albums